Rottington is a hamlet which is  from Whitehaven; in the parish of St Bees, Copeland, Cumbria, England. Since 1961, the population has halved from 92 to 51 people.

History 
The name "Rottington" comes from a farm or settlement connected with Rot(t)a. In 1762 the area became the property of Sir James Lowther. Rottington was a township in the parish of St Bees, in 1866 Rottington became a civil parish in its own right. On 1 April 1934 the parishes of Preston Quarter and Sandwith were merged into Rottington and Whitehaven. On 1 April 1974 the parish was abolished and merged with St Bees.

References

External links
 Cumbria County History Trust: Rottington (nb: provisional research only – see Talk page)

Hamlets in Cumbria
Former civil parishes in Cumbria
St Bees